Angurd (also Romanized as Āngūrd and Angūrd) is a village in Ojarud-e Gharbi Rural District, in the Central District of Germi County, Ardabil Province, Iran. At the 2006 census, its population was 43, in 6 families.

References 

Towns and villages in Germi County